Cremmus is a genus of flies in the family Dolichopodidae. It contains only one species, Cremmus fontanalis, known from China.

References

Peloropeodinae
Dolichopodidae genera
Diptera of Asia
Insects of China
Monotypic Diptera genera
Endemic fauna of China